Franz Zeno Diemer (3 July 1889, in Oberammergau – 27 April 1954, in Friedrichshafen) was a flight pioneer in Bavaria, setting a number of world records, and Flight Officer for Bavarian Lifeguard Regiment.

Early life

He was born in Oberammergau, Bavaria, the son of the painter, Michael Zeno Diemer and his wife, Hermine (née Von Hillern), eldest daughter of the writer, Wilhelmine von Hillern.   Trained as an engineer, in 1912 he joined the Bavarian Lifeguard Regiment, at that time a flying squadron. He was a member of "Bogohl 8" (the bomber squadron operated by the Senior Military Command) with the rank of Flying Officer.

In July 1921 he joined Dornier in Friedrichshafen as test pilot and for trial flying of new aircraft. In 1922, after Dornier's move to Marina di Pisa Italy, he worked as test pilot, head of the aerodynamics department and manager of the advertising department. From 1935 on he  worked exclusively as manager of the advertising department and was editor in chief of the company newspaper "Dornier-Post" which appeared from the autumn of 1935 until July 1938.

From August 1939 to the end 1944, he was in the German Air Force, but post World War II he rejoined Dornier and assumed charge of the suggestions scheme, retiring in March 1946.

Functions at BMW

Test pilot for BMW.

On 13 September 1919 he set a world altitude record for a passenger aircraft (8 people on board) in a Junkers F.13 powered by a BMW IIIa aircraft engine (the pilot, however, may have been Moes).

Later in Life
Died in Friedrichshafen.

See also
History of BMW
Rapp Motorenwerke

Notes

References

External links
BMW Group archives

1889 births
1954 deaths
BMW people
Aviation pioneers
German World War I pilots
Luftwaffe personnel of World War II
German aviation record holders
People from Garmisch-Partenkirchen (district)
Military personnel from Bavaria